The Tomb of Zeng Guofan is the tomb of Zeng Guofan, a Chinese statesman and military leader of the late Qing dynasty. The tomb dates from 1873, and is located in Pingtang Subdistrict, Yuelu District of Changsha, Hunan, China. In 2013 it has been the focus of the State Council of China as a National Historical and Cultural Site.

History 
Zeng Guofan, a statesman and military leader of the late Qing dynasty, died in 1872 and was buried in Pingtang Subdistrict, Yuelu District, Changsha, Hunan in the following year.

During the Cultural Revolution, the Red Guards attacked and smashed the tomb. Some ornaments were stolen in the 1980s. It has been designated as a municipal cultural relic preservation organ in 1993 and a provincial cultural relic preservation organ in 1996, respectively. It was renovated by local government in 2002. In 2013, it was listed among the "Major National Historical and Cultural Sites in Hunan" by the State Council of China.

Gallery

References

Bibliography
 

Buildings and structures in Changsha
Buildings and structures completed in 1873
Tourist attractions in Changsha
1873 establishments in China
Historical and Cultural Sites Protected at the Provincial Level in Hunan
Major National Historical and Cultural Sites in Hunan
Yuelu District
Zeng Guofan